Rocky Hills is a rural locality in the local government area (LGA) of Glamorgan–Spring Bay in the South-east LGA region of Tasmania. The 2016 census recorded a population of 12 for the state suburb of Rocky Hills.

History 
Rocky Hills is a confirmed locality.

Geography
The eastern boundary follows the shoreline of Great Oyster Bay.

Road infrastructure 
Route A3 (Tasman Highway) passes through from south-east to north-east.

References

Towns in Tasmania
Localities of Glamorgan–Spring Bay Council